Axial symmetry is symmetry around an axis; an object is axially symmetric if its appearance is unchanged if rotated around an axis.  For example, a baseball bat without trademark or other design, or a plain white tea saucer, looks the same if it is rotated by any angle about the line passing lengthwise through its center, so it is axially symmetric.

Axial symmetry can also be discrete with a fixed angle of rotation, 360°/n for n-fold symmetry.

See also 
 Axiality (geometry)
 Circular symmetry
 Reflection symmetry
 Rotational symmetry has a more general discussion
 Chiral symmetry describes the use in quantum mechanics

References

Rotational symmetry